This is a list of notable public and private universities in Morocco

The higher education system comprises 13 public universities, 8 private universities, and 211 private institutes and schools. Public universities are free, except for Al Akhawayn University and the International University of Rabat, which are tuition-based. Higher education is governed by the Ministry of Higher Education, Research, and Training.

Public universities
 Abdelmalek Essaâdi University, Tétouan - Tanger
 Al Akhawayn University, Ifrane 
 Cadi Ayyad University, Marrakesh
 Chouaib Doukkali University, El Jadida
 Euro-Mediterranean University of Morocco, Fes
 Hassan II University, Mohammedia
 , Settat
 , Kenitra
 Ibn Zohr University, Agadir
 Mohamed Premier University, Oujda
 Mohammed V University of Rabat, Rabat
 Moulay Ismail University, Meknès
 Sidi Mohamed Ben Abdellah University, Fez
 Université Moulay Slimane, Beni Mellal
 University of Al Quaraouiyine, Fes
 University of Hassan II Casablanca Ain Chok, Casablanca

Public-Private partnership universities

 , Casablanca

 Mohammed VI Polytechnic University, Benguerir
 International University of Rabat, Salé

Private universities
Université Mundiapolis, Casablanca
, Agadir
Université Internationale de Casablanca, Casablanca
 (UPF), Fez
The Superior School of Visual Arts of Marrakech

See also
Conservatories of Morocco
Information technology in Morocco
Science and technology in Morocco

References 

 
Universities
Morocco
Morocco